Argentina (silverweeds) is a genus of plants in the rose family (Rosaceae) which is accepted by some authors, as containing 64 species, but classified in Potentilla sect. Leptostylae by others.

Selected species
Argentina anserina – Common silverweed
Argentina anserinoides – New Zealand silverweed (= Potentilla anserinoides)
Argentina egedei – Eged's silverweed
 Argentina pacifica – Pacific silverweed

References

External links
Ikeda, H. and Ohba, H. (1999). A systematic revision of Potentilla l. Section Leptostylae (Rosaceae) in the Himalaya and adjacent regions. University of Tokyo, University Museum Bulletin 39 (3). Available online.

Edibility of Silverweed: Visual identification and edible parts of Silverweed.

 
Rosaceae genera